This is a list of towers in Bern.  As the city of Bern in Switzerland grew, gatehouse towers and other defensive towers were built.  Many of the towers have been rebuilt multiple times and served many different purposes over the centuries since Bern's founding.

For more information on the history of the UNESCO Cultural World Heritage Site of Bern, see Old City of Bern.

References

External links
 

Towers in Bern
Towers, Bern
Bern